Breeding and care for farm animals for economic, cultural and religious reasons, also known as animal husbandry, is a growing occupation in Nepal.

History

Animals were reared in the distant past in Nepal, but the history of proper animal husbandry in the country dates back to the period of the Gopal Dynasty. It is believed that Gopal kings used to rear cows. When the Gospels entered Nepal from India, they brought cows with them. Similarly, the Mahispal dynasty used to rear buffalo.

Present status
In Nepal, animal husbandry is one of the main occupations, along with farming, as Nepal is an agricultural country. About 30% of the total population is engaged in agriculture. In Nepal, people rear different animals like goats, pigs, Cattle, oxen, buffalos, Chickens and dogs.

See also
Agriculture in Nepal
Agriculture
Nepal

References

Animal husbandry
Agriculture in Nepal